Ahmadreza Yalameha (born in Iran, Isfahan) is a writer, researcher and the 4th President of the Islamic Azad University of Dehaqan. His major specialty focuses on codicology and identification of ancient texts. His work contributions include 30 books and 100 research scientific articles.

Mr. Yalameha is a young researcher who is a full professor and his research interests include literature, comparative literature, study of Rumi, study of Hafez, codicology and identification.

Careers
 Quarterly didactic Literature Review Journal manager editor-in-chief 
 Editorial Board Members

See also 
Higher education in Iran
Islamic Azad University

References

Significant Works 

 https://www.researchgate.net/publication/321225446_thlyl_mnzwmh_ghnayy_wamq_w_dhra
 http://www.ijch.net/index.php?m=content&c=index&a=show&catid=44&id=386

Living people
Writers from Isfahan
Academic staff of the Islamic Azad University
Year of birth missing (living people)
Codicologists